Ralf Keidel (born 6 March 1977) is a German football coach and former player. He works as assistant manager for FC Ingolstadt 04 II.

Career
Keidel made his debut on the German professional league level in the Bundesliga for MSV Duisburg on 31 March 2000 when he came on as a substitute in the 88th minute in a game against SSV Ulm 1846.

References

External links
 

1977 births
Living people
Association football midfielders
German footballers
Germany under-21 international footballers
German expatriate sportspeople in England
Expatriate footballers in England
1. FC Schweinfurt 05 players
Newcastle United F.C. players
MSV Duisburg players
Rot Weiss Ahlen players
Rot-Weiß Oberhausen players
FC Ingolstadt 04 players
FC Ingolstadt 04 II players
Bundesliga players
2. Bundesliga players
3. Liga players
Sportspeople from Würzburg
Footballers from Bavaria